"Nothing Can Stop Me" is a 2014 song by the singer CeCe Peniston, released as her first release on S1EG label. Two weeks prior to its release, the work was presented on a free download mixed compilation R&B Is Not Dead Vol. 1 by OhSoKool. It gained an urban adult contemporary airplay, peaking for four weeks at number twenty-nine on the Adult R&B Songs.

Credits and personnel
 Cecilia Peniston - lead vocals

Track listings and formats
 MD, EU & US, #()
 CD-R, US, #()
 "Nothing Can Stop Me - 3:28

 MD, US, #(}
 "Nothing Can Stop Me (Dance Mix)" - 5:03

Charts

Weekly charts

References

General

 Specific

External links 
 

2014 singles
CeCe Peniston songs
2014 songs